Rhipsalis cereoides is a species of plant in the family Cactaceae. It is endemic to Brazil.  Its natural habitats are subtropical or tropical moist lowland forests and rocky areas. It is threatened by habitat loss.

References

cereoides
Cacti of South America
Endemic flora of Brazil
Vulnerable flora of South America
Taxonomy articles created by Polbot